Margaret Knight is the name of:

Margaret E. Knight (1838–1914), American inventor
Margaret K. Knight (1903–1983), British psychologist and humanist
Margaret Rose Knight (1918–2006), First Lady of North Carolina